Emil Dale Academy is a musical theatre school in England. The Hitchin campus offers a Bachelor of Arts degree awarded by the University of Bedfordshire, BTEC Level 3 diploma, and foundation and sixth form courses for full-time students (16+). Weekend classes for part-time students (3–21) are held at both the Hitchin and Cambridge campuses.

The Stage called it one of the fastest-growing musical theatre schools in the country in 2016. The school is affiliated with Dale Hammond Associates.

History
The school's namesake Emil Dale, a graduate of London's ArtsEd from Biggleswade, began hosting a musical theatre Sunday school with co-founder Victoria Hammond when he was 23 with the idea of inviting West End professionals to guest teach classes at a more affordable rate than other programmes of its kind. They started off with 22 students in the school hall of St Andrews' Church of England Primary School in Benslow.

The Cambridge branch, affiliated with North Cambridge Academy, began in 2014.

The official campus was established at the site of a former factory on Wilbury Road in Hitchin converted into studios in 2014 and a 200-seat theatre, known as the Factory Playhouse Theatre, in 2015. West Side Story was the venue's inaugural performance.

In 2018, the Bachelor of Arts (BA) in Musical Theatre path was introduced in a partnership with the University of Bedfordshire.

References

2009 establishments in England
Educational institutions established in 2009
Schools of the performing arts in the United Kingdom
University of Bedfordshire